The Great Space Coaster is a children's television show that was broadcast in first-run syndication from 1981 to 1986.

Production
The series was co-created by Kermit Love (original Muppet designer and builder for Jim Henson) and Jim Martin (who later went to work on a number of Henson-related projects including Sesame Street). The series' episodes, which were videotaped in New York City, were directed by Dick Feldman and were fitted with a laugh track. It was produced by Sunbow Productions and distributed by Claster Television, a division of Hasbro.

The puppets were designed by The Great Jones Studio, New York, under the supervision of Kermit Love. The puppet designers and builders consisted of Jim Kroupa, Robert Lovett, Christoper Lyall, John Orberg, and Matthew Stoddart.

Summary
The Great Space Coaster is about three young singers (Francine, Danny, and Roy) who are brought to a habitable asteroid in space called Coasterville by a clown named Baxter who pilots the "space coaster", a roller coaster-like spaceship. The asteroid is populated by strange-looking, wise-cracking puppet characters such as Goriddle Gorilla, Knock Knock the Woodpecker, Edison the Elephant, and Gary Gnu (host of "The Gary Gnu Show"). Baxter is forever on the run from M.T. Promises, a nefarious ringmaster who plans to re-capture Baxter and return him to the circus he worked at before he escaped. Each episode ends with a different life lesson, and various celebrity guest stars (such as Mark Hamill of Star Wars fame and composer Marvin Hamlisch) occasionally dropped by.

In each episode, Roy shows a short film on his portable, fold-up television. Most often, the segments came from La Linea, an Italian animated series about a little man who is drawn (using a single line) at the beginning of the segment and then springs to life, communicating with his animator through high-pitched Italian mixed with gibberish. Other animated shorts from the National Film Board of Canada, Weston Woods Studios, Jim Thurman, and others were shown, usually broken up into two or more segments within an episode.

Francine, Roy, and Danny sing a song together as the Space Coasters in each episode (sometimes originals like "Wacky Talk", sometimes older songs like "Be a Clown" or covers of 1960s and 1970s hits), and the various puppet characters often sing songs as well.

A few years into the show's run, the MTV-like "Rockin' with Rory" segment began where a VJ named Rory introduced "Danny and the Space Coasters" performing cover tunes. There were also other additions to the show including Baffle, Big Jock Ox, and the Huggles. While the action was mostly videotaped on the space set, it was not unusual for the characters to venture down to Earth for filmed musical numbers.

Characters

Space Coasters
 Francine (portrayed by Emily Bindiger) - Francine, or Fran for short, is a young woman from a fishing village on the East Coast and is the leader of the Space Coasters where she plays the guitar. She also acts as Baxter's second-in-command.
 Danny (portrayed by Chris Gifford) - Danny is from a small midwestern town, a member of the Space Coasters, and Francine's second-in-command. He plays the drums in the Space Coasters.
 Roy (portrayed by Ray Stephens) - Roy is from the big city and a member of the Space Coasters where he plays the keyboards. He is also a good poet. Roy showed clips and short films on his hand-held magic screen.

Coasterville inhabitants
 Baxter (performed by Francis Kane) - A large, gentle clown who once worked for M.T. Promises in an apparently slave-like situation at his circus and lives in fear of ever going back. He now pilots the space coaster, taking the characters from Earth to the asteroid. He can magically disappear by twirling around, a talent he uses to escape M.T.'s attempts to catch him and bring him back to his circus. Whenever the gang wants to leave on a field trip, he always exclaims "The Great Space Coaster is ready for takeoff!" When the gang assembles, he always says "Get on board for a magical trip, and where we land this time is anybody's guess!" He sometimes plays the "baxophone" (an instrument similar to a saxophone) with the Space Coaster Band.
 Goriddle Gorilla (performed by Kevin Clash) - A gravel-voiced orange gorilla-like creature. He has a tendency to be rude, obnoxious, nosy, lazy, and a nuisance, but somehow the gang on the asteroid seem to like him just the way he is. He is roommates with Edison the Elephant. Goriddle and Knock Knock introduce Gary Gnu whenever "The Gary Gnu Show" segment comes on; both have filled in as host of the segment in Gary's absence. In Goriddle's case, he made the segment his own by redecorating the studio as a jungle...and by putting on a "Guerrilla Warfare Fun-time Show" in which he told various one-liners amid small arms-fire and artillery-fire. Gary did not take this well: "He's turned my gnews set into a battlefield!"
 Knock Knock the Woodpecker (performed by John Lovelady in 1981–1983, Noel MacNeal in 1983–1986) - A prissy pink woodpecker who lives in the hollow of a tree and tells a lot of knock-knock jokes. She, alongside Goriddle Gorilla, occasionally introduces Gary Gnu whenever "The Gary Gnu Show" segment comes on. Knock Knock also intros the "Book of the Week in Review" segments by saying "And here's Gary Gnu with the Book of the Week in Review", usually waking Gary from a nap. Knock Knock also uses her sense of humor at times to give Goriddle a taste of his own medicine.
 Edison the Elephant (performed by John Lovelady in 1981–1983, Jim Martin in 1983–1986) - A strange, large robotic-looking elephant with a segmented hose-like ever-moving trunk, semi-transparent fan-like ears, and a voice like an echo. He loves plants and tends a large garden. Edison and Goriddle Gorilla are roommates.
 Gary Gnu (performed by Jim Martin) - A green gnu-like newscaster who hosts "The Gary Gnu Show" each episode and is well known for his catchphrase "No gnews is good gnews with Gary.... Gnu." He adds a guttural "g" sound to the beginning of any word he spoke which normally began with an "n", such as "gnews" for "news" and "gnaturally" for "naturally". Whenever introduced by either Goriddle Gorilla or Knock Knock, the introduction is always "And now for something really gnew, here's Gary Gnu." The only difference is that Goriddle always says "Wow!" each time he does so. Gary always begins by saying "This is Gary Gnu, and the 'No Gnews Is Good Gnews Show'. The only TV gnews program guaranteed to contain NO gnews whatsoever!" In his segments, Gary introduced and narrated film clips of people in silly situations, weird sporting events, unlikely inventions, and the like. Gary's unusual speaking style was inspired by the 1957 Flanders and Swann song "The Gnu" which told the story of a gnu in a zoo who spoke much as Gary did, adding a "g" sound to the beginning of various words; Gary actually sang the song in one episode. Gary Gnu's gnewscasts were punctuated by comments and jeers from the filming crew with the crew having different items or things thrown onstage as a way of misinterpreting one of the words that Gary says in his gnews. Occasionally, he was set up for a practical joke after one of his own one-liners, as the crew called him a "turkey" followed by the dropping of a paper turkey (with Gary's picture taped over the face) onto Gary Gnu's head with a gobbling sound effect. Gary was not immune to practical joking himself; he once produced a spin-off of his show called Candid Coasterville in which he played an assortment of humiliating pranks on several of his friends...including Goriddle, Baxter, Danny, Roy, and Fran. Gary later apologized after all five victims barged into his studio and told him what they thought of his set-ups.
 Speed Reader (portrayed by Ken Myles) - A young man who appears on "The Gary Gnu Show". He can allegedly read incredibly fast, zipping through an entire book (usually a recently published novel for young readers) in seconds, and then offering a short review. Before a reading, he will warm up by doing "push-ups" with his eyelids (blinking rapidly and moving his eyes around). Before each Speed Reader appearance, there is a short film - set to the "Speed Reader" theme song - showing Speed Reader "doing his thing". Gary Gnu reads the lyrics while a chorus shouts the "Speed Reader, Speed Reader" refrain.
 M.T. Promises (performed by Jim Martin) - A nefarious, bulgy-eyed, top hat-wearing, caped ringmaster who is the primary antagonist of the series. He has always been scheming to capture Baxter the Clown and take him back to his circus. More silly than sinister, he sweeps onto and off the set accompanied by evil circus music and his farewell is always a sarcastic "Have a nice day." M.T. Promises has a full-length mirror that talks back to him. The mirror serves as his conscience and frequently gets him so mad that he tries to smash the "good for nothing" mirror with a swift kick, but he always hurts his foot and not the mirror. Whenever M.T. Promises is not trying to recapture Baxter, he tries to swindle the characters by selling them broken items for money, playing dirty pranks on the characters, and trying to break up the Space Coasters by inflating the egos of the members. One episode had M.T. Promises helping out the Space Coasters' telethon to get the money to replace their worn-out instruments. His name is a pun of Empty Promises.
 The Huggles - Small, furry creatures who have stories read to them by Baxter (usually about "Bomba the Barbarian"). They consist of Fluffy, Puffy (both performed by Pam Arciero), and Scruffy (performed by Kevin Clash). They also have a younger sister named Baby Huggle (performed by Pam Arciero) who appears later on and who spends most of her time sleeping. Baxter brought the Huggles to the asteroid after he found their eggs in space. As their intro song put it, Baxter "brought 'em home to hatch 'em, and now they're here to stay..." Introduced a few years into the series' run, the extreme cuteness of these characters was an attempt to appeal to a younger demographic. Their catchphrase was "Hey, what's snappenin'?"
 Rory (performed by Kevin Clash) - A wild-looking lion-like VJ. He appeared a few years into the show's run as the host of "Rockin' with Rory", a segment featuring music videos by the Space Coasters, typically performing covers of 1960s hits. He often runs late and shows up in his pajamas while making a claim about why he was late when the crew asks "Late again, Rory! What’s the story?" Rory replies "You guys won’t believe this, but..." and launches into one of his many wild excuses for being late. The crew never believes it. Rory then says "Believe this" as he introduces the Space Coasters' act.
 Baffle (performed by Jim Martin) - A furry, horned magical alien from the neighboring planet Blip (where everything is either backwards or upside down or just plain weird) who appeared a few years into the show's run. He casts spells by chanting the phrase "Miki Pooka Tiki". Baffle can see 12 minutes into the future. He loves to give free advice and when the residents of Coasterville have a problem, they pay Baffle a visit. Unfortunately, his advice is often so silly or cryptic that they usually have to solve the problem themselves.
 Big Jock Ox (performed by Kevin Clash) - An ox-like character who appeared a few years into the show's run. Big Jock Ox often appeared on "The Gary Gnu Show" as the sports expert.

Episodes

Cast
 Emily Bindiger - Francine
 Chris Gifford - Danny
 Ray Stephens - Roy
 Ken Myles - Speed Reader

Puppeteers
 Pam Arciero - Baby Huggle, Fluffy, Puffy
 Kevin Clash - Goriddle Gorilla, Rory, Big Jock Ox, Scruffy
 Francis Kane - Baxter
 John Lovelady - Knock Knock the Woodpecker (1981–1983), Edison the Elephant (1981–1983)
 Noel MacNeal - Knock Knock the Woodpecker (1983–1986)
 Jim Martin - Gary Gnu, M.T. Promises, Baffle, Edison the Elephant (1983–1986)

Soundtrack

The soundtrack was released in 1982 by Columbia Records.

Side A
1. (1) The Great Space Coaster Song (written by Anne Bryant and Spencer Michlin)
(2) The Name Game (written by Lincoln Chase and Shirley Elliston)
(3) Funnybone
2. Don't Pick Me Last
3. Knock Knock Rock
4. I Like Scary Things
5. Mr. Rhyme
6. (1) Goriddle's Banana Song (I'm Bananas Over Bananas)
 (2) Yellow-Orange Song

Side B
1. Spin About / Jump N' Shout
2. The Thing (written by C. Grean)
 (2) It's Baxter
3. Goriddle Rock
4. Sticks and Stones
5. (1) No Gnews Is Good Gnews
 (2) It's Good to See You Again
6. My Way (Comme D'Habitude) (English lyrics by Paul Anka, French lyrics by Gilles Thibault, music by C. Francois and J. Revaux)

References

External links
 

1981 American television series debuts
1986 American television series endings
1980s American children's comedy television series
American television series with live action and animation
American television shows featuring puppetry
English-language television shows
Fictional spacecraft
First-run syndicated television programs in the United States
Peabody Award-winning television programs
Space adventure television series
Television series by Metromedia
Television series by Sunbow Entertainment
Television series by Hasbro Studios
Television shows filmed in New York City
Television series by Claster Television